Kenneth Harry Gibbons (born 24 December 1931) was Archdeacon of Lancaster from 1981 to 1997.

He was educated at Chesterfield Grammar School, the University of Manchester and Ripon College Cuddesdon. After National Service he was ordained in  1956. After a curacy in Fleetwood he was Schools Secretary of the  Student Christian Movement from  1960 to 1962. He was Senior Curate of St Martin-in-the-Fields, Westminster and held incumbencies in New Addington and Portsea, Portsmouth before his Archdeacon’s appointment;  and St Michael's on Wyre afterwards.

References

1931 births
Alumni of the University of Manchester
Alumni of Ripon College Cuddesdon
Archdeacons of Lancaster
Living people